National Pedagogic University may refer to:

 National Pedagogic University (Colombia)
 National Pedagogic University (Mexico)